A Great Way To Care is a Hong Kong medical crime drama television series produced by Marco Law and TVB. It stars Alex Fong as Dr. Ko Lap-yan, a senior psychiatrist who has a specialty in diagnosing mentally ill criminals.

Produced in 2008, the first series premiered on Malaysia's AOD on 8 June 2009. Originally scheduled for a summer 2009 release in Hong Kong, the broadcast of the series was put on hold after the success of Lee Tim-sing's period serial, Rosy Business. Lee's sister production, Sweetness in the Salt, was aired in place of A Great Way to Care.

With a total of 20 episodes, the series finally premiered on Jade in Hong Kong on 10 January 2011. A sequel series of 25 episodes was renewed in early 2012, and premiered on TVB's Jade and HD Jade channels on 18 March 2013.

Series overview
Dr. Ko Lap-yan heads a team of senior psychiatrists and residents at the Yan Wo Hospital in Hong Kong. Most episodes revolve around the team diagnosing patients. With a specialty at diagnosing criminals, Ko also has close ties with the Serious Crime Unit of the Hong Kong Police Force, a unit headed by Senior Inspector Chung Kwon-ban. The second series sees Ko's resignation from the Yan Wo Hospital; he is later transferred to a new psychiatric department, the Forensics Psychiatry Department, of Bok On Hospital, where he formally diagnoses criminals.

Cast and characters

Series 1 characters

Ko Family

Lin Family

Yan Wo Hospital

Hong Kong Police CID

Medical cases

Post-traumatic stress disorder (Chapter 1)

Antisocial personality disorder (Chapter 2 - 3)

Compensated dating girl (Chapter 4 - 6)

Personality disorder (Chapter 6 - 9)

Policemen Murders (Chapter 10 - 12)

Obsessive compulsive disorder (Chapter 13 - 17)

Dissociative identity disorder (Chapter 17 - 20)

Others

Series 2 characters

Bok On Hospital

Sui Oi Psychiatric Clinic

Major Case Unit 

Season 1 viewership ratings.

Season 2 viewership ratings.

Awards and nominations

45th TVB Anniversary Awards 2011
 Nominated: Best Drama
 Nominated: Best Supporting Actor (Ram Chiang)
 Nominated: Best Supporting Actress (Vivien Yeo)

International Broadcast
  - 8TV (Malaysia) from II onwards.

References

External links
TVB.com A Great Way to Care - Official Website 

TVB dramas
2011 Hong Kong television series debuts
2013 Hong Kong television series endings